Godagama  is a town close to city of Colombo Sri Lanka. It is located in Colombo District within the Western Province, Sri Lanka.

Godagama is located on the High Level road at the main junction of the Avissawella to Colombo (A4) road and the Padukka to Borella (B242) road. Godagama falls within the Homagama electorate and Homagama divisional secretariat which is the largest population divisional secretariat in Sri Lanka  (local government authority).

Near by cities 
To the West - Homagama, Kottawa, Pannipitiya, Maharagama. To the East - Padukka, Hanwella. To the North- Athurugiriya, Malabe, Battaramulla, Kaduwela and to the South Pitipana, Meegoda

Transport
Railway: Kelani valley line

Bus routes heading through Godagama Town:
69/122  - Maharagama - Kandy
18/122 Hatton
78/122 Nawalapitiya
98/122 Ampara
99 - Colombo - Badulla - Welimada - Passara - Balangoda - Bandarawela
122 - Colombo - Avissawella - Ratnapura - Embilipitiya - Suriyawewa - Rakwana
124 - Maharagama - Ihala Bope
125 - Pettah - Padukka - Ingiriya
128/2 - Homagama - Pansala Handiya
138 - Godagama - Pettah
190 - Meegoda - Pettah  (Via Malabe)
219 - Homagama - Hanwella (via Meegoda)
293 - Homagama - Hanwella (via Panagoda)
299 - Homagama - Lenegala
299/2 - Homagama - Nagasgodalla ( Via Lional Jayasinge Mawatha)
366 - Homagama - Halbarawa

See also
List of towns in Western Province, Sri Lanka

External links

Populated places in Western Province, Sri Lanka